Joan Dickinson is a contemporary American artist, writer, director, curator, and educator.

Biography

Education and Teaching 

Dickinson holds a doctorate (2012) from the Literary Arts program at the University of Denver, and teaches independently serving diverse populations from pre-school age to elders in rural and urban classrooms; as a faculty member and visiting artist in art schools, colleges, universities; and in writing and learning centers with self-identified learning disabled students, homeless women, and writers from Mexico, China, Japan, Egypt, Viet Nam, Pakistan, Norway, Iraq, Italy, Saudi Arabia, Turkey, France, and the United States.

Creative Practice 

Beginning as a young woman, Dickinson has developed and sustained ways of working using interrelated forms including visual and performance art, photography, books and multiples, teaching, farming and environmental restoration, astrology, ceremony, and palliative care. During a twelve-year period, Dickinson moved her creative practice to a 300-acre wetland wilderness sanctuary in rural Illinois, often living outdoors or inhabiting a six-floor silo and barn. In that place and its surrounds, Dickinson created and directed twelve place-based, large-scale performances each derived from the direct experience of living in a wilderness sanctuary, reading and writing, music, friendship, contemplation, and physical labor. So too, in cooperation with others, Dickinson learned basic environmental restoration practices such as how to unpin rivers, remove agricultural tiles, rout buckthorn, and safely conduct controlled burns. She became a beekeeper and herbalist, and learned to observe and integrate celestial alignments. In these and other ways, including her work as an artist, Dickinson familiarized herself with one place – its stories and mythologies entwined with its geographies, communities, and climate – and the wider connection of one place to others.

In roughly the same time period and continuing into the present day, other work, including a long-term collaboration with the performance group, Goat Island, has been presented in more traditional contemporary art spaces and theaters including the Institute of Contemporary Arts in London, 3rd Eye Center & Center for Contemporary Arts in Glasgow, PS 122 in New York City, Highways Performance Space in Santa Monica, Illinois State Museum in Springfield, and many locations in Chicago. Chicago venues include: the Lyric Opera, the Chicago Cultural Center, Hyde Park Art Center, Randolph Street Gallery, the Lurie Garden at Millennium Park, and the Museum of Contemporary Art. Other venues included the Experimental Sound Studio, Club Lower Links, Cabaret Metro, and, in Denver, Platte Forum and Counterpath Press, and within numerous creative residencies around the world.

 Goat Island Retrospective/Exhibition + Performances + Symposium (2019)
 The Cooking School of the Air (2012-2019)
 Coming in from the North (2007-2016)
 The Dream of the Owl Sisters (performance + book; 2013-2015)
 "Mule Deer Are Everywhere in the West" from A Poetic Inventory of Rocky Mountain National Park (2012)
 "Lindow Man" from Fat Boy Review (2011)
 With All that She Is She Desires to Give Great Pleasure (2007–2009)
 pretty	pretty pretty over there too (2007)
 Degrees of Wildness/The Charioteer (2006)
 The Language of Birds (2005)
 Atmosphere (2005)
 In the Palace of the Night Heron (2004)as part of Bird Brain with Jennifer Monson
 13 Moon (2003–2004)
 Devotion (2001–2002)
 Drove Road (1999–2000)
 The Architecture of Honey (1997–1998)
 Flower (1996–1997)
 Hunter’s Moon (1995–1996)
 Hula (1994)
 Big Goddess Powwow (1994-1996)
 Black Cake (1993)
 White Castle (1993)
 Mental Beauty/Enduring Affection (1992)
 We Got A Date (1989); Can’t Take Johnny to the Funeral (1991) as part of Goat island Performance Group

Awards 

 Flinders Island Artist Residency (2016-2017)
 Platte Forum Creative Residency (2013)
 University of Denver (DU) (2008-2012) Fellowship
 DU Arts, Humanities, and Social Sciences Graduate Writing Scholar (2009-2010)
 Crosscut Award (2007)
 Illinois Arts Council Project Grant (2006)
 Columbia College Faculty Development Award (2006)
 Chicago Department of Cultural Affairs commission (2005)
 Illinois Arts Council Fellowship (2004)
 Illinois Arts Council Project Grant (2002)
 Richard H. Dreihaus Individual Artist Award, the Richard Dreihaus Foundation, Nomination (2001)
 Cal Arts/ Alpert Award in the Arts, Nomination (2001)
 Columbia College Excellence in Teaching Award (2000)

Other Cultural Work 

Beginning in 1989 and continuing until early 1997, Dickinson worked at Randolph Street Gallery (RSG), the erstwhile alternative arts space in Chicago (1979-1998). Initially, Dickinson was a member of the committee responsible for performance programming (called “Time Arts” at RSG) under the direction of Mary Jo Schnell along with Peter Taub, the Executive Director of the gallery. From 1993 and until her resignation, Dickinson was the Director of Time Arts and worked in both curatorial and production capacities.

In addition to Time Arts programming, and what are now called “live” art events (including the Grotto d’Amore––a fund-raiser cum ceremonial happening wherein same-sex couples and groups, inter and intra species companions, and lovers of the incarcerated could marry and divorce in a single night), Dickinson’s work, in tandem with the Time Arts Programming Committee and RSG Staff members, included the design and implementation of several public art projects beginning in 1989 with the first Day without Art events in collaboration with Encarnacion Teruel and the Mexican Fine Arts Center Museum (now called the National Museum of Mexican Art), the University of Illinois with Matthew Owens, and with Nathan Mason, the First Presbyterian Church. On December 1, 2, and 3 of that year, portraits of people living with AIDS were projected at locations throughout Chicago: the ballroom of the museum, the student union of the university, and outdoors against the walls of the church on Michigan Avenue’s Gold Coast.

Selected Time Arts Programming  

Quraysh Ali, Nancy Andrews, Ron Athey,
 Sadie Benning, Dalida María Benfield, Jaap Blonk, Lynn Book
,
Mwata Bowden, Maris Bustamante, Janet Cardiff, Sandra Cisneros, William Close, Portia Cobb, Dominique Dibbell, Richard Elovich

, Coco Fusco, Goat Island, James Grigsby, Essex Hemphill, In the Flesh (Series)
, John Jesurun, John Malpede, Iris Moore, Jennifer Monson, Eileen Myles, Natsu Nakajima
, Achy Obejas, Matthew Owens, Michelle Parkerson, Guillermo Gomez Pena, Adrian Piper, Pomo Afro Homos, Lordes Portillo, Marlon Riggs
, Root Wy’mn Theater Company,

Sacred Naked Nature Girls
, Carolee Schneeman Dread Scott, Joe Silovsky, Theodora Skipitares,  Laetitia Sonami, Patricia Smith, Spiderwoman Theater, Lawrence Steger, Chris Sullivan, That Time of the Months (Series), Blair Thomas,
Rose Troche, Kitty Tsui, Brendan de Vallance, Gregory Whitehead, Dolores Wilber, Michael Zerang

References

External links 

 www.thearchitectureofhoney.com
 www.thedreamoftheowlsisters.org

Living people
American performance artists
American women performance artists
American women writers
Year of birth missing (living people)
21st-century American women
American women curators
American curators